The men's doubles tournament of the 2011 BWF World Championships (World Badminton Championships) was held from August 8 to 14. Cai Yun and Fu Haifeng were the defending champions.

In the final, Cai Yun and Fu Haifeng defeated Ko Sung-hyun and Yoo Yeon-seong 24–22, 21–16.

Seeds

  Cai Yun / Fu Haifeng (champions)
  Mathias Boe / Carsten Mogensen (quarterfinals)
  Jung Jae-sung / Lee Yong-dae (semifinals)
  Koo Kien Keat / Tan Boon Heong (quarterfinals)
  Ko Sung-hyun / Yoo Yeon-seong (final)
  Markis Kido / Hendra Setiawan (second round, retired)
  Mohammad Ahsan / Bona Septano (semifinals)
  Alvent Yulianto / Hendra Aprida Gunawan (third round)
  Hirokatsu Hashimoto / Noriyasu Hirata (third round)
  Fang Chieh-min / Lee Sheng-mu (third round)
  Chai Biao / Guo Zhendong (third round)
  Naoki Kawamae / Shoji Sato (third round)
  Ingo Kindervater / Johannes Schöttler (second round)
  Hiroyuki Endo / Kenichi Hayakawa (third round)
  Cho Gun-woo / Kwon Yi-goo (third round)
  Mads Conrad-Petersen / Jonas Rasmussen (quarterfinals)

Draw

Finals

Section 1

Section 2

Section 3

Section 4

References
Main Draw

2011 BWF World Championships